is a former Japanese football player.

Playing career
Umeda was born in Kakamigahara on May 30, 1976. After graduating from high school, he joined Japan Football League (JFL) club Seino Transportation in 1995. He played many matches from first season and became a regular player in 1997. However the club was disbanded end of 1997 season. In 1998, he moved to JFL club Oita Trinity (later Oita Trinita). He played many matches and the club was promoted to new league J2 League from 1999. Although his opportunity to play decreased from 2000, the club won the champions in 2002 and was promoted to J1 League from 2003. He also became a regular player as defensive midfielder from 2003. However his opportunity to play decreased in 2007. In 2008, he moved to newly was promoted to J2 club, FC Gifu based in his local on loan and he played as regular player. In 2009, he returned to Oita Trinita. However he could not play many matches in 2009 and the club was relegated to J2 from 2010. The club released many central player and he played many matches as regular player in 2010. He retired end of 2010 season.

Club statistics

References

External links

1976 births
Living people
Association football people from Gifu Prefecture
Japanese footballers
J1 League players
J2 League players
Japan Football League (1992–1998) players
Seino Transportation SC players
Oita Trinita players
FC Gifu players
Association football midfielders